Vinjanampadu may refer to:

 Vinjanampadu, Guntur, a village in Guntur District, Andhra Pradesh, India
 Vinjanampadu, Prakasam, a village in Prakasam District, Andhra Pradesh, India